Earle W. Fricker was a former member of the Wisconsin State Assembly.

Biography
Fricker was born on February 16, 1926. He attended Washington High School in Milwaukee, Wisconsin before attending Lawrence University, Marquette University and Marquette University Law School. During World War II, he served in the United States Navy. He died on June 30, 1998.

Political career
Fricker was elected to the Assembly in 1954 and re-elected in 1956. He was a Republican.

References

Politicians from Milwaukee
Military personnel from Milwaukee
United States Navy sailors
United States Navy personnel of World War II
Lawrence University alumni
Marquette University alumni
Marquette University Law School alumni
1926 births
1998 deaths
20th-century American politicians
Republican Party members of the Wisconsin State Assembly